Geoffrey Murray (born 1 February 1943) is a Guyanese cricketer. He played in fifteen first-class matches for Guyana from 1962 to 1970.

See also
 List of Guyanese representative cricketers

References

External links
 

1943 births
Living people
Guyanese cricketers
Guyana cricketers
Sportspeople from Georgetown, Guyana